Shanawad is a village in Dharwad district of Karnataka, India.

Demographics 
As of the 2011 Census of India there were 392 households in Shanawad and a total population of 1,945 consisting of 997 males and 948 females. There were 220 children ages 0-6.

References

Villages in Dharwad district